Vaisala can refer to:

Last name 

 Vilho Väisälä, Finnish meteorologist and businessman.
 Yrjö Väisälä, Finnish astronomer and physicist.

Other 

 Brunt–Väisälä frequency, the angular frequency at which a vertically displaced parcel will oscillate within a statically stable environment.
 Vaisala, Samoa - a village in Samoa.
 Vaisala - a Finnish company founded by Vilho Väisälä.